In Canadian politics, a leadership convention is held by a political party when the party needs to choose a leader due to a vacancy or a challenge to the incumbent leader.

Overview 

In Canada, leaders of a party generally remains that party's de facto candidate for Prime Minister until they die, resign, or are dismissed by the party. In the federal New Democratic Party (NDP) and some provincial NDPs, the position of party leader was treated as all other positions on the party's executive committee, and open for election at party conventions generally held every two years although incumbent leaders rarely face more than token opposition.

Usually, outgoing leaders retains the party leadership until their successor is chosen at a leadership convention. However, in some circumstances, such as the death or immediate resignation of a leader, that is not possible, and an interim leader is appointed by the party for the duration of the leadership campaign.

In a few instances where a single leadership candidate has been unopposed by the entry deadline, the leadership convention has instead served as a venue for the membership to ratify the candidate. Even in such situations, however, the convention must still take place before the candidate can assume the formal and permanent leadership of the party, even if they are already serving as the party's interim leader.

Traditionally, each riding association of a party holds a special meeting to elect a fixed number of delegates to represent it at a leadership convention. These meetings would often select "alternate delegates" or "alternates", who would attend the convention but vote only if one of the delegates from the riding association was unable to attend. In addition, delegates are often selected by the party's youth and women's associations in each riding, and party associations at university and college campuses.

In addition to the elected delegates, a large number of ex officio delegates attend and vote at leadership conventions. These ex officio delegates are automatically entitled to attend by virtue of being an elected member of parliament for that party, a member of an affiliated party in a provincial legislature, a member of the party's national or provincial executive, of the executive of an affiliated women's or youth organization.

Because of the implementation of "one member one vote" (OMOV) systems and proportional delegate elections by most parties, conventions have declined in importance. In recent years, the result of the vote is either known before the convention, or the voting does not take place at the venue.

In a pure "one member one vote" system, each party member casts a ballot to elect the leader, and all ballots have equal weight. There are modified OMOV system may allow all members to vote but may weigh them differently in order to ensure equality among ridings regardless of party membership or which guarantee a proportion of the vote to historically important constituencies such as labour in the case of the NDP.

The Liberal Party of Canada held the first leadership convention in 1919, electing William Lyon Mackenzie King. Prior to that the leader of the party was chosen by the party's parliamentary caucus. The historical Conservative Party used a leadership convention to select R.B. Bennett as party leader in 1927.

The Parti Québécois was the first political party in Canada to adopt an OMOV system. Most provincial and federal parties adopted forms of OMOV in the 1990s.

Until 2003, when it adopted an OMOV system, every biennial convention of the Co-operative Commonwealth Federation and its successor, the New Democratic Party, in the twentieth century was a leadership convention. However, in practice, contested elections were only held in the NDP when there was a declared leadership race.

Both the modern Conservative Party and the NDP have instituted "one member one vote" systems in recent years. In 2003, the federal NDP used a modified system where the vote is calculated, so that ballots cast by labour delegates had 25% weight in the total result while votes cast by party members had 75%. While this modification is still used by some provincial sections of the NDP, the federal NDP now uses a pure OMOV process without a carve out for labour affiliates.

In 2004, the modern Conservative Party adopted the Progressive Conservative Party system of OMOV, where each riding had equal weight in a point system, with each riding being assigned 100 points, regardless of the number of votes cast in that riding. The party's other predecessors, the Reform Party of Canada and Canadian Alliance, had pure OMOV systems. In 2021, the party constitution was amended to award one point per vote cast in a riding, up to a maximum of 100 points. 

The Liberals were the last federal party to select its leaders using delegated conventions, though more recent Liberal conventions used a system where delegates in a riding were apportioned by proportional representation. In 2009 the Liberal Party approved a constitutional amendment requiring future leadership elections to be conducted using a modified OMOV system in which each riding is accorded equal weight. The 2009 convention that ratified Michael Ignatieff's leadership was conducted under the old rules. The last delegated Liberal convention to feature a contested race was the 2006 convention that chose Stéphane Dion.

The Bloc Québécois has used a pure OMOV system since 1997.

Recent federal conventions 
The Conservatives held their most recent leadership election on 23–24 August 2020 due to Andrew Scheer's resignation as party leader following the party's poorer-than-expected showing in the 2019 federal election. The Conservatives elected Erin O'Toole as its new leader on the fourth ballot.

The Liberals, on April 14, 2013 chose Justin Trudeau as their leader at the party's leadership election. The Liberal Party used a weighted One Member One Vote system in which all party members could cast ballots but in which they would be counted so that each riding had equal weight.

The New Democratic Party held its most recent leadership election on October 1, 2017, due to incumbent leader Thomas Mulcair having lost a vote on a leadership review at the New Democratic Party's federal convention held in Edmonton, Alberta on April 10, 2016. The NDP chose Jagmeet Singh as its new leader.

The Bloc Québécois held its most recent leadership election on January 17, 2019 and chose Yves-François Blanchet as leader.

The Green Party held its most recent leadership election between September 26 and October 3, 2020 and chose Annamie Paul as leader on the eighth ballot. With Paul's resignation as leader on November 10, 2021, necessitating a future leadership election.

See also

 Primary election

Active federal parties
Bloc Québécois leadership elections
Conservative Party of Canada leadership elections
Green Party of Canada leadership elections
Liberal Party of Canada leadership elections
New Democratic Party leadership conventions

Defunct federal parties
Canadian Alliance leadership elections
Progressive Conservative Party of Canada leadership elections
Social Credit Party of Canada leadership conventions

Provincial parties

Alberta
Alberta Liberal Party leadership elections
Alberta New Democratic Party leadership elections
Alberta Progressive Conservative Association leadership elections
1968 Social Credit Party of Alberta leadership election
2009 Wildrose Alliance Party leadership election

British Columbia
British Columbia Liberal Party leadership conventions
British Columbia New Democratic Party leadership conventions
British Columbia Reform Party leadership elections
British Columbia Social Credit Party leadership conventions

Manitoba
Manitoba Liberal Party leadership elections
Manitoba New Democratic Party leadership elections
Manitoba Progressive Conservative Party leadership elections

New Brunswick
New Brunswick Liberal Association leadership elections
New Brunswick Progressive Conservative Party leadership elections

Newfoundland and Labrador
Newfoundland and Labrador Liberal Party leadership elections
Progressive Conservative Party of Newfoundland and Labrador leadership elections

Nova Scotia
Nova Scotia Liberal Party leadership elections
Nova Scotia New Democratic Party leadership elections
Nova Scotia Progressive Conservative Association leadership elections

Ontario
Ontario CCF/NDP leadership conventions
Ontario Liberal Party leadership elections
Ontario Progressive Conservative leadership conventions
Green Party of Ontario leadership elections

Prince Edward Island
Prince Edward Island Liberal Party leadership elections
Progressive Conservative Party of Prince Edward Island leadership elections

Quebec
Parti Québécois leadership elections
Quebec Conservative Party leadership elections
Quebec Liberal Party leadership elections
Union Nationale leadership elections

Saskatchewan
Saskatchewan New Democratic Party leadership conventions
Saskatchewan Party leadership elections
Progressive Conservative Party of Saskatchewan leadership elections

External links 
 List of Leadership Conventions (Parliament of Canada site)

Political terminology in Canada